Troy Butler (born 22 September 1967) is a former speedway rider from Australia.

Speedway career 
Butler was champion of Australia when he won the 1986 Australian Championship.

He rode in the top tier of British Speedway riding for the Oxford Cheetahs from 1985 until 1992. He was signed by Oxford Cheetahs before the 1985 season after being seen in action by Hans Neilsen and Simon Wigg who were touring Australia at the time.

In 1988, he became the British League Division Two Riders Champion riding for Milton Keynes Knights.

References 

1967 births
Living people
Australian speedway riders
Milton Keynes Knights riders
Oxford Cheetahs riders